The Greenville Drive are a Minor League Baseball team based in Greenville, South Carolina. They are the High-A affiliate of the Boston Red Sox and are a member of the South Atlantic League. They play their home games at Fluor Field at the West End, and their mascot is a frog named Reedy Rip'it.

From 1993 to 2004, the team played in Columbia, South Carolina, as the Capital City Bombers, an affiliate of the New York Mets succeeding the Columbia Mets. In the team's first season as a Red Sox affiliate, 2005, they were known as the Greenville Bombers.

History
The Drive began their history in 1993 as the Capital City Bombers. The name was chosen to honor members of the Doolittle Raiders, who had conducted their initial training in Columbia. The Bombers won the South Atlantic League championship in 1998.

Following the 2004 season, the Bombers changed affiliations and became the affiliate of the Boston Red Sox, who had previously been affiliated with the Augusta GreenJackets, also of the South Atlantic League.  On February 11, 2005, Minor League Baseball announced that the Bombers had been granted permission to move to Greenville, where a new park opened in 2006.  The Bombers would play in Greenville Municipal Stadium in 2005.

On October 27, 2005, the Bombers announced the team's name would change to the Drive. The name was chosen due to the presence of BMW US Manufacturing and Michelin in the area and, more generally, due to Greenville's rich automotive past. An alternative name was chosen after Shoeless Joe Jackson called the Joes but Major League Baseball vetoed the name due to his role in the Black Sox Scandal in 1919.

In 2008, outfielder Che-Hsuan Lin became the first Drive player to be selected to the annual All-Star Futures Game, which took place on July 13 at Yankee Stadium. Lin  hit a two-run home run on the first pitch he saw that helped the World team beat the US Team, 3–0. He finished 2-for-2 and was named the game's Most Valuable Player. Former pitcher Clay Buchholz participated in the 2007 edition, a season after playing for the Drive.

In 2009, Ryan Lavarnway played for the Drive, hitting 21 home runs and a .540 slugging percentage (both tops for Red Sox minor leaguers) and 87 RBIs in 404 at bats.

On May 8, 2012, three Greenville pitchers combined to toss the club's first ever no-hitter. Miguel Pena (six innings), Hunter Cervenka (two), and Tyler Lockwood (one) joined forces to defeat the Rome Braves, 1–0. A solo home run by Keury De La Cruz off of David Filak in the sixth inning accounted for the only run of the game.

In the 2017 postseason, the team defeated the Kannapolis Intimidators, 3 games to 1, to win the franchise's first championship since becoming the Greenville Drive in 2006.

The Drive had an in-state rivalry with the Charleston RiverDogs, an affiliate of the New York Yankees, while in the South Atlantic League. This particular rivalry was also fueled by the regional rivalry between the two parent clubs.

In conjunction with Major League Baseball's restructuring of Minor League Baseball in 2021, the team moved from being the Red Sox' Class A affiliate to being their High-A affiliate, and became a member of the High-A East league; in a corresponding move, the Salem Red Sox moved from Class A-Advanced to Low-A. In 2022, the High-A East became known as the South Atlantic League, the name historically used by the regional circuit prior to the 2021 reorganization.

Stadium

Capital City Stadium in downtown Columbia, was the home of the Bombers. The stadium was originally built in 1927, but was completely rebuilt in 1991. Capital City Stadium has a seating capacity for 6,000 spectators, has a grass surface and features the following fence dimensions: (LF) 330 ft., CF 400 ft., RF 320 ft.

The Bombers had sought assistance from the City of Columbia in building a new stadium located in the Congaree Vista area of Columbia. Efforts to construct a stadium to be shared with the University of South Carolina's baseball team fell through when the University demanded the Bombers pay $6 million in fees upfront. Following this, Bombers owner Rich Mozingo sought to relocate the team.

Mozingo's efforts paid off when, in 2005, the Bombers relocated to Greenville, South Carolina. Following the move, the Bombers played their home contests in Greenville Municipal Stadium in Greenville, then moved to  Fluor Field at the West End, in the heart of downtown Greenville. The stadium was named "Ballpark of the Year" for the 2006 season by Baseballparks.com, beating out such stadiums as St. Louis's Busch Stadium and Medlar Field at Lubrano Park in State College, Pa.

The stadium shares the dimensions of their parent club's major league park, Fenway Park, and boasts its own (slightly shorter) "Green Monster" complete with manual scoreboard and "Pesky's Pole" in right field.

Season-by-season records
Below are the season records for the Capital City Bombers, Greenville Bombers, and Greenville Drive.

Capital City Bombers
The team competed in the South Atlantic League (Class A).

 The team was known as the "Columbia Bombers" during the 1994 season.
 Mansolino resigned on June 18, at the request of the Mets, following the alcohol-related death of player Tim Bishop in April; he was replaced by Stephenson.
Source:

Greenville Bombers
The team competed in the South Atlantic League (Class A).

Source:

Greenville Drive
The team competed in the South Atlantic League (Class A) through 2020, then moved up to the High-A classification in 2021 as members of the to the High-A East, which became the South Atlantic League in 2022.

Division finish and league rank columns are based on overall regular season records. The South Atlantic League utilized a split-season, with first-half winners and second-half winners of each division meeting in the playoffs; if the same team won both halves of the season, the team with the next best overall record was selected.

Roster

Notable Greenville alumni

 Steve Avery (2000) MLB All-Star
 Mookie Betts (2013) 3 x MLB All-Star
 Xander Bogaerts (2011) MLB All-Star
 Clay Buchholz (2006) 2 x MLB All-Star
 Paul Byrd (2004) 2 x MLB All-Star
 Jermaine Dye (1995) 2 x MLB All-Star
 Dwight Evans (1970) 3 x MLB All-Star
 Rafael Furcal (2000) 3 x MLB All-Star; 2000 NL Rookie of the Year
 Marcus Giles (2000) MLB All-Star
 Bryan Harvey  (1997) 2 x MLB All-Star
 Andruw Jones (1996) 5 x MLB All-Star; 10 x Gold Glove
 Ryan Klesko (1995) MLB All-Star
 Kevin Millwood (1997, 2001) MLB All-Star; 2005 AL ERA Leader
 Terry Pendleton  (1994) MLB All-Star; 1991 NL Most Valuable Player
 Anthony Rizzo (2008, 2009) 3 x MLB All-Star
 Jason Schmidt (1994) 3 x MLB All-Star; 2003 NL ERA Leader
 Adam Wainwright  (2003) 3 x MLB All-Star

Notes

References

Further reading

External links
 
 Statistics from Baseball-Reference

 
South Atlantic League teams
Baseball in Greenville, South Carolina
Professional baseball teams in South Carolina
Boston Red Sox minor league affiliates
Sports in Columbia, South Carolina
New York Mets minor league affiliates
1993 establishments in South Carolina
Baseball teams established in 1993
High-A East teams